John Michael Brotherton (7 December 1935) is a retired Anglican priest.

Brotherton was educated at St John's College, Cambridge, and Ripon College Cuddesdon. He was ordained in 1962 and was a curate at St Nicholas' Chiswick, after which he was chaplain of Trinity College, Moka. He was rector of St Michael's Diego Martin from 1969 to 1975 and then vicar of St Mary and St John's Oxford. From 1981 to 1991 he was vicar of St Mary's Portsea. From 1991 until his retirement in 2002 he was the Archdeacon of Chichester.

References

1935 births
Alumni of St John's College, Cambridge
Alumni of Ripon College Cuddesdon
Archdeacons of Chichester
Living people